Pogonarthria is a genus of African plants in the grass family.

 Species
 Pogonarthria fleckii (Hack.) Hack. - Angola, Mozambique, Zambia, Zimbabwe, Botswana, Namibia
 Pogonarthria leiarthra Hack. - Namibia
 Pogonarthria refracta Launert  - Zambia
 Pogonarthria squarrosa (Roem. & Schult.) Pilg. - Africa from Ivory Coast to South Africa and Madagascar; naturalized in Arizona (Cochise and Pima Counties)

 Formerly included
see Desmostachya Eragrostis 
 Pogonarthria bipinnata - Desmostachya bipinnata  
 Pogonarthria brainii - Eragrostis brainii

References

Flora of Africa
Poaceae genera
Chloridoideae